Krutinsky is a rural locality (a khutor) in Mikhaylovka Urban Okrug, Volgograd Oblast, Russia. The population was 221 as of 2010. There are 10 streets.

Geography 
Krutinsky is located 44 km northwest of Mikhaylovka. Karagichevsky is the nearest rural locality.

References 

Rural localities in Mikhaylovka urban okrug